The Santubong River is a river in Sarawak, Malaysia. It flows from the Sarawak River north to the coastal city of Santubong (:ms:Santubong) where it empties into the South China Sea.

See also
 List of rivers of Malaysia

References

Rivers of Sarawak
Rivers of Malaysia